Denis Ashton Warner CMG OBE (12 December 1917 – 12 July 2012) was an Australian journalist, war correspondent and historian.

Warner was born in New Norfolk in Tasmania's Derwent Valley. He attended The Hutchins School, where he was school captain, before embarking on a career in journalism. He began working for the Mercury as a copy boy in the late 1930s before being shifted to Melbourne to work for the Herald. After his return from war service in the Middle East (1941–43), he came to the attention of Sir Keith Murdoch, who dispatched him to Asia with the directive to "tell us how it is". On 4 May 1945, Warner was on board the aircraft carrier HMS Formidable near the island of Okinawa when it was hit by a Japanese Kamikaze aircraft, the suicide plane striking the deck only 30 ft from where he stood. Later that year he married Herald reporter Peggy Hick. Following the war's end, he worked for Reuters and the Australian Associated Press as head of the Tokyo bureau, from whence he reported on Japan's post-war experience and interviewed General Douglas MacArthur. In 1949, Warner was instrumental in publicising the case of Lorenzo Gamboa, a Filipino man targeted by the White Australia policy, after a chance encounter in a Tokyo post office.

In 1949 he was appointed Far Eastern Correspondent for the Herald and the London Daily Telegraph, becoming a freelancer in 1955. He was awarded a Fulbright Scholarship in 1956 and an Associate Nieman Fellowship at Harvard University in 1957. He wrote for a number of international news magazines, including the Reporter, Look and the Atlantic. He was a correspondent for the Telegraph on the Korean War, which he described as a "tragic accident". It was during Korea that he developed a bitter rivalry with Wilfred Burchett, whom he considered a traitor for his support of the Chinese.

Warner was a significant correspondent from the Vietnam War, where he was critical of the American conduct of a war he nevertheless supported. He continued to write on Asian affairs until 1983, also serving as a member of the Victorian State Advisory Committee of the Australian Broadcasting Corporation from 1979 to 1981. From 1981 to 1995 he was editor of the Asia-Pacific Defence Reporter. His hawkish foreign policy views distinguished him from many of his more liberal contemporaries.

Warner was appointed Officer of the Order of the British Empire in 1971 and Companion of the Order of St Michael and St George in 1982. He was a foundation patron of the Australia Defence Association in 1981, remaining involved with the organisation until his death. He continued writing into his later life, until ill health and his wife's death in 2010 led to a decline. Warner died in Melbourne in 2012.

Publications

Warner published a number of books on Asian affairs:

Out of the Gun (1957)
Australia's Northern Neighbours (1957–63)
Hurricane from China (1961–62)
The Last Confucian (1963)
Reporting South East Asia (1966)
The Tide at Sunrise: A History of the Russo-Japanese War, 1904–05 (1974, with Peggy Warner)
Not with Guns Alone: How Hanoi Won the War (1977–78)
Certain Victory (1978)
The Great Road: Japan's Highway to the 20th Century (1979, with Peggy Warner)
Kamikaze: The Sacred Warriors (1983–84, with Peggy Warner and Sadao Seno)
Disaster in the Pacific: New Light on the Battle of Savo Island (1992, with Peggy Warner and Sadao Seno)
Wake Me If There's Trouble: An Australian Correspondent at the Front Line — Asia at War and Peace 1944–64 (1995)
Not Always on Horseback (1997)

References

1917 births
2012 deaths
Officers of the Order of the British Empire
Companions of the Order of St Michael and St George
20th-century Australian journalists
Australian war correspondents
The Herald (Melbourne) people
The Mercury (Hobart) people
War correspondents of World War II
Australian Army personnel of World War II
Australian Army soldiers
Fulbright alumni